Crypsithyrodes concolorella is a moth of the family Tineidae. It was first described by Francis Walker in 1863. It has been recorded from Australia, French Polynesia, the Seychelles, Fiji, Hawaii, Java, Rennell Island, the Caroline Islands and Malaya.

On the Seychelles, it is associated with the Seychelles sheath tailed bat (Coleura seychellensis).

Larvae have been reared from oblong, flat, brown cases which were found in trash in the axils of the leaves of dead palm.

External links

Tineidae